Ryan Tyrone Bailey (born 7 September 1982, in Western Province) is a South African first class cricketer for North West. A right-handed batsman, Bailey has previously represented South Africa Under-19s.

Current Head Coach of Stellenbosch University (Maties) Cricket Club.

References

 

1982 births
Living people
Border cricketers
Free State cricketers
North West cricketers
South African cricketers
Knights cricketers
Khulna Division cricketers
Cricketers from the Western Cape